The 2015–16 SPHL season was the 12th season of the Southern Professional Hockey League (SPHL). The Pensacola Ice Flyers defeated the Peoria Rivermen in the President's Cup final 3 games to none to win their 3rd SPHL title in 4 years.

Preseason
On May 4, 2015, the SPHL held an expansion draft in preparation for the Macon Mayhem to begin play as the league's 9th team.

Regular season

Standings
Final standings

‡ William B. Coffey Trophy winners
 Advanced to playoffs

Attendance

President's Cup playoffs

Playoff bracket

Finals
Home team is listed first.

Awards

All-SPHL selections

References

External links
Southern Professional Hockey League website

Southern Professional Hockey League seasons
Sphl